This is a list of Estonian television related events from 2015.

Events
21 February - Elina Born and Stig Rästa are selected to represent Estonia at the 2015 Eurovision Song Contest with their song "Goodbye to Yesterday". They are selected to be the twenty-first Estonian Eurovision entry during Eesti Laul held at the Nordea Concert Hall in Tallinn.
31 May - Jüri Pootsmann wins the sixth season of Eesti otsib superstaari.

Debuts

Television shows

1990s
Õnne 13 (1993–present)

2000s
Eesti otsib superstaari (2007–present)

Ending this year

Births

Deaths
29 October – Herta Elviste (born 1923), actress

See also
2015 in Estonia